The Lake Placid Station is a former railroad station, built by the Delaware and Hudson Railway in Lake Placid, New York. 

In the post-World War II period, the NYC's North Star train, and later, the Iroquois, provided direct sleeping car service from New York City's Grand Central Terminal to Lake Placid.  During summers the NYC's Interstate Express ran sleeping cars direct from Chicago to Lake Placid via Utica. On April 24, 1965 the NYC ran its final train on the route.

See also
New York Central Railroad Adirondack Division Historic District

References

External links
 Official site

Former New York Central Railroad stations
Railway stations in the United States opened in 1904
1904 establishments in New York (state)
Buildings and structures in Essex County, New York